The women's high jump event at the 2016 Summer Olympics took place between August 18–20, at the Olympic Stadium.

Summary
There were 17 athletes who made the final. The height of 1.93 proved to be the undoing for five of them, even though all of them had cleared 1.94 in qualifying the day earlier. Among the non-qualifiers were World indoor Champion Vashti Cunningham and European silver medalist Airinė Palšytė. Eight more were excised at 1.97 m, leaving the medalists plus one extra.  Waving her fingers at the bar before she jumped, 37 year old Ruth Beitia remained perfect to that point. Mirela Demireva was jumping over her previous best but made it on her first attempt as well. She was in second place with one miss earlier in the competition. Blanka Vlašić had one miss at every height, a pattern that put her in third place. And making the bar on her last attempt, world leader Chaunté Lowe was in fourth place. All but Demireva had cleared 2.00 before, Lowe in 2016. Earlier in her career Vlašić made 2.00 routine and was attempting the world record of 2.10 on occasion. None of them could make 2.00 in the final and their earlier positions were confirmed. It was Beitia's first gold medal in World level competition. This was also the first Olympic women's high jump since 1980 where the winning height was below two metres.

Competition format
The competition consisted of two rounds, qualification and final. Athletes started with a qualifying round. Jumping in turn, each athlete attempts to achieve the qualifying height. If they had failed at three jumps in a row, they would have been eliminated. After a successful jump, they received three more attempts to achieve the next height. Once all jumps had been completed, all athletes who had achieved the qualifying height went through to the final. If fewer than 12 athletes had achieved the qualifying standard, the best 12 athletes would have gone through. Cleared heights reset for the final, which followed the same format until all athletes fail three consecutive jumps.

Records
, the existing World and Olympic records were as follows.

Schedule
All times are Brasilia Time (UTC-3)

Results

Qualification
Qualification rule: qualification standard 1.94m (Q) or at least best 12 qualified (q).

Final

References

Women's high jump
2016
2016 in women's athletics
Women's events at the 2016 Summer Olympics